Dostoyevskaya is a station on the Line 4 of the Saint Petersburg Metro, opened on December 30, 1991. Walkways connect Dostoyevskaya with Vladimirskaya metro station of the Kirovsko-Vyborgskaya Line.

Saint Petersburg Metro stations
Railway stations in Russia opened in 1991
Railway stations located underground in Russia